The Faro Vargas, also known as Faro de Cabo Cruz, is a staffed lighthouse located on the southernmost part of Cape Cruz in Cuba. Construction of the 32 metre lighthouse started in 1862 and was finished in 1871.

See also

 List of lighthouses in Cuba

References 
Citations

Bibliography

Vargas
Buildings and structures in Granma Province
Lighthouses completed in 1871
1871 establishments in the Spanish Empire
19th-century architecture in Cuba